Liddell is a surname. Notable people with the surname include:
 Alice Liddell (1852–1934), Lewis Carroll's "muse"
 Allan Liddell (1908–1970)
 Alvar Lidell (1908–1981), BBC radio announcer and newsreader
 Andreas Lidel (1740s–1780s), composer and virtuoso performer
 Andy Liddell (born 1973), Scottish footballer
 Angélica Liddell (born 1966), Spanish writer, theatre director, and actor
 Anna Forbes Liddell (1891–1979), American academic and feminist
 Sir B. H. Liddell Hart (1895–1970), British military strategist
 Barney Liddell (1921–2003), American big band musician
 Billy Liddell (1922–2001), Scottish footballer
 Cedric Liddell (1913–1981), Canadian rower
 Chad Liddell (born 1977), Australian rules footballer
 Charles Liddell (1813–1894)
 Chekesha Liddell, professor
 Chris Liddell (born 1958), businessman and philanthropist,
 Chuck Liddell (born 1969), mixed martial artist
 Claire Liddell (born 1937), Scottish composer
 Clive Gerard Liddell (1883–1956), British Army officer
 Colin Liddell (1925–1997), Scottish footballer
 Danny Liddell, Scottish footballer
 Dave Liddell (born 1966), Major League Baseball catcher
 David Liddell (1917–2008), Scottish soldier, insurance broker, and farmer
 David Liddell-Grainger (1930–2007), Deputy Lieutenant of Berwickshire
 Dorothy Liddell (1890–1938), archaeologist
 E. J. Liddell (born 2000), American basketball player
 Elizabeth Liddell (1770–1831), British artist
 Emilie Autumn Liddell (born 1979), American rock/alternative/electronic artist
 Emma Liddell (born 1980), Australian cricketer
 Eric Liddell (1902–1945), Scottish athlete
 Frank Liddell (politician) (1862–1939), Australian politician
 Frank Liddell, American record producer
 Frederick Francis Liddell (1865–1950), British lawyer and civil servant
 Gary Liddell (1954–2015), Scottish footballer
 George Liddell (1895–?), English football player and manager
 Guy Liddell (1892–1958), British intelligence officer
 Helen Liddell (born 1950), British politician
 Henry Liddell (1811–1898), Classical scholar and father of Alice Liddell
 Henry Liddell, 1st Baron Ravensworth (1708–1784), 1st Baron Ravensworth
 Ian Liddell (born 1938), structural engineer
 Ian Liddell-Grainger (born 1959), Member of Parliament for Bridgwater
 Ian Oswald Liddell (1919–1945), Victoria Cross recipient* Alan Liddell (1930–1972), English cricketer
 James Liddell (1905–?), Scottish footballer
 Jim Liddell (born 1953), English footballer
 John Aidan Liddell (1888–1915), Victoria Cross recipient
 Keith Liddell, boxer, mathematician and author
 Linea Søgaard-Lidell (born 1987), Danish politician
 Moses J. Liddell (1845–1891), justice
 Ned Liddell (1878–1969), English football player, manager, and scout
 Nona Liddell (1927–2017), British violinist
 Pamela Liddell (born 1986), Scottish international football striker
 Patrick Liddell, Composer and video artist
 Richard Liddell (1690s–1746)
 Robert Liddell (1908–1992), English writer
 Robert Liddell (Pittsburgh) (1837–1893), Mayor of Pittsburgh, Pennsylvania
 Robert Scotland Liddell (1885–1972), British journalist
 Robin Liddell (born 1974), Scottish racing driver
 Samuel Liddell (pirate) (fl. 1716), pirate in the Caribbean
 Sarah Liddell (born 1992), Pornographic film actress
 St. John Richardson Liddell (1815–1870), Louisiana planter and Confederate general
 Stuart Liddell (born 1973), Scottish bagpipe player
 Thomas Liddell (1800–1880), first Principal of Queen's University, Kingston, Ontario
 Wade Liddell (born 1979), Scotland international rugby league footballer

See also
 
 Lidell Townsell, house-music artist
 Liddle
 Lidl (supermarket chain)
 
 Liddel (disambiguation)

Surnames
English-language surnames
Surnames of English origin
Surnames of Scottish origin
Surnames of British Isles origin
Scottish surnames